This is a list of waterways within the county of Lincolnshire.

A

B

C

D

E

F

G

H

I

K

L

M

N

O

P

R

S

T

U

V

W

Y

Waterways
Waterways in England
Fens of England
Waterways
Waterways